Hélène Lefebvre (born 26 February 1991) is a French rower. She competed in the women's double sculls event at the 2016 Summer Olympics and finished 5th.

References

External links
 

1991 births
Living people
French female rowers
Olympic rowers of France
Rowers at the 2016 Summer Olympics
Rowers at the 2020 Summer Olympics
Place of birth missing (living people)
European Rowing Championships medalists
20th-century French women
21st-century French women